This is a list of University of Albany people.

Notable alumni

Arts
 Sally Sheinman, artist

Business
 Steven Berkowitz (1980), former Senior Vice President of Microsoft Online Services, and CEO of MOVE
 Jang Young-sik (PhD 1970), economist, former president of the Korea Electric Power Company
 Edward A. Maher (1867), president of the Third Avenue Railway
 William Orton (1847), president of the Western Union Telegraph Company
 Norman E. Snyder (1983), co-founder of SoBe
 Ronn Torossian, (1995), CEO of 5W Public Relations, the 13th largest PR agency in the US
 Tony Vinciquerra (1977), former CEO of Fox Entertainment Group and current CEO and chairman of Sony Pictures Entertainment
 Hamdi Ulukaya, founder and CEO of Chobani

Education
 Herman Aguinis, George Washington University School of Business professor and 77th President of the Academy of Management
Delia E. Wilder Carson (1833-1917), art educator
 Michael R. Gottfredson, former president of the University of Oregon
 Lucy Stedman Lamson (1857-1926), business woman, educator
 Harris Pastides, 29th President of the University of South Carolina

Government, law, and public policy
 Mike Arcuri (1981), former District Attorney for Oneida County, New York; former representative for New York's 24th congressional district
 Catherine Bertini (1971), former Executive Director, United Nations World Food Programme; Fellow of the Bill and Melinda Gates Foundation
 Rosa Clemente, 2008 Green Party vice presidential candidate
 Scott de la Vega, acting United States Secretary of Interior under Joe Biden
 Abdirahman Mohamud Farole (1990), former President of the Puntland region of Somalia
Christopher Hahn (BA 1994) Fox News Contributor and Syndicated Radio Host
 Gerald Jennings, mayor of Albany, New York
 Benjamin Kallos, lawyer and politician
 Lawrence Korb (PhD 1969), Council on Foreign Relations and Center for American Progress; Assistant Secretary of Defense (1981–85)
 John M. McHugh (MPA 1977), Congressman from New York's 23rd congressional district (1993–2009); U.S. Secretary of the Army (2009–2015)
 Harvey Milk (1951), gay rights figure; former San Francisco city supervisor; assassinated in 1978
 Susan Molinari (BA 1980, MA 1982), former New York Congresswoman, Staten Island
 Zina Lisandrou Panagidi (1992), Mayor of Lefkoniko
 Joseph E. Persico (1952), best-selling author of Nuremberg: Infamy on Trial; biographer of Edward R. Murrow, Nelson Rockefeller, William Casey; former Nelson Rockefeller speechwriter
 John D. Porcari (1985), Deputy U.S. Secretary of Transportation under the Obama administration; former Maryland Secretary of Transportation
 Angelo L. Santabarbara (BS, 2001), New York State Assemblyman from New York's 111th district (2013–present)
 Louis R. Tobacco (1994), New York State Assemblyman (62nd District)
 Christine A. Varney, (1977), Assistant Attorney General; United States Department of Justice Antitrust Division
 Mark Weprin (BA 1983), former member of the New York State Assembly and New York City Council
 Richard C. Wesley (1971), judge on the U.S. Court of Appeals, 2nd Circuit
 Lee M. Zeldin (BA 2001), United States Representative from New York's 1st congressional district (2015–2023); New York State Senator from New York's 3rd district (2011-2014)

Journalism
 Tom Junod (1980), journalist and writer for Esquire magazine since 1997
 Gloria Rojas, journalist
 Bob Ryan (1967), former lead weatherman, WRC-TV (Channel 4, NBC affiliate in Washington, D.C.)
 Tameka Abraham (2017), journalist and writer for Essence Magazine, Interview Magazine, Greatest Magazine and more.

Literature
 Emma Lee Benedict (1857-1937), editor, educator, author
 Marcia Brown, children's author
 Stephen Adly Guirgis (1990), playwright (Jesus Hopped the A Train, Our Lady of 121st Street)
 Joyce Hinnefeld, writer of fiction and nonfiction
 Gregory Maguire (1976), author of the books Confessions of an Ugly Stepsister and Wicked (which became a Broadway musical)
 Paul Pines, poet, writer, memoirist; founded The Tin Palace, a jazz nightclub on the Bowery in New York City, and the Jazz at the Lake: Lake George Jazz Weekend
 Radclyffe (Dr. Lenora Ruth Barot), writer and editor of lesbian romance, paranormal romance, erotica and mystery; founder and publisher of Bold Stroke Books

Performing arts, Broadcasting
 Priya Anand, Indian film actress and model
 Awkwafina, aka Nora Lum (2011), American rapper, television personality, and actress.
 Edward Burns, film actor
 Carolee Carmello (1962), Broadway actress
 Randy Cohen (1971), former writer for Late Night with David Letterman; currently writes "The Ethicist" column for The New York Times Magazine and answers ethical questions from listeners of All Things Considered
 Jamie Gold (1991), television producer and 2006 World Series of Poker Main Event Champion
 Harold Gould (1947), actor, The Sting, TV series Rhoda and Golden Girls
 Steve Guttenberg, film actor
 Randye Kaye, author, radio talk show host, and voice actress
 Brian Lehrer (1973), radio talk show host
 Brandon Jay McLaren (2002), television actor
 Ignacyo Matynia (2013), film and television actor, My Nightmare Landlord, Break Every Chain
 Michael Nolin (BA 1970), film studio executive; producer of Mr. Holland's Opus; screenwriter of Maniac Magee; professor at Savannah College of Art and Design
 John Ortiz, film and TV actor, The Job, Carlito's Way, Miami Vice, American Gangster)
 Josh Ostrovsky, aka The Fat Jewish
Stacey Prussman (1992) Actress, Radio Host, Stand-Up Comedian, 2021 New York City mayoral candidate 
 Howard Reig (1942), radio and television announcer
 Marie Roda, television personality featured on MTV's The Real World and The Challenge.
 Allan Steele, actor and writer
 Frank Whaley, film and television actor
 D.B. Woodside (1991), actor on TV series Buffy the Vampire Slayer, 24 and "Single Ladies

Science
 Frances E. Allen (1954), IBM Fellow, Turing Award winner (2006)
 Sallie W. Chisholm (PhD 1974), biological oceanographer and professor at Massachusetts Institute of Technology
 Alan M. Davis (1970), IEEE Fellow for contributions to software engineering; author; entrepreneur; pomologist; horticulturalist
 Lois Privor-Dumm (1986), director, Alliances and Information for PneumoADIP, Johns Hopkins Bloomberg School of Public Health
 Myriam Gorospe, scientist, head of the RNA Regulation Section at the National Institute on Aging (NIA)
 Alanna Schepartz (1982), Milton Harris Professor of Chemistry at Yale University and Director, Yale Chemical Biology Institute; Fellow, American Academy of Arts & Sciences
 Celal Sengor (1982), Turkish geologist, foreign member of the American Philosophical Society
 Omar M. Yaghi (1985), James and Neeltje Tretter Chair Professor of Chemistry and Co-Director of the Kavli Energy NanoSciences Institute at University of California, Berkeley; recipient of the American Chemical Society Chemistry of Materials Award (2009)

Social sciences
 Robert H. Babcock (BA 1953, MA 1957), historian
 Anne Case (BA), economist
 Philip B. Coulter (PhD 1966), political scientist
 David Pietrusza (BA 1971, MA 1972), historian and author
 William J. Taverner (1990), author, sexologist, editor of the American Journal of Sexuality Education
 Gerhard Weinberg (1948), diplomatic and military historian

Sports
 Rashad Barksdale (2007), NFL cornerback
 Todd Cetnar, professional basketball player
 Dave Clawson (MA, 1990), Head Football Coach, Wake Forest
 Bouna Coundoul (attended 2002-04), Senegalese international soccer goalkeeper
 James Jones (BA 1986, MA 1995), Head Coach of the Yale University Men's Basketball Team
 Jordan Levine, professional lacrosse player
 Ashley Massaro, professional wrestler
 Brett Queener (2007), professional lacrosse player
 Joe Resetarits, professional lacrosse player
 Rob Senderoff, college basketball coach
 Jason Siggers (born 1985), basketball player in the Israel Basketball Premier League
 Lyle Thompson, professional lacrosse player, two-time Tewaaraton Award Winner
 Tara VanDerveer (attended 1971–72), head women's basketball coach at Stanford University; member of Naismith Memorial and Women's Basketball Halls of Fame
 Jarren Williams (defensive back), NFL defensive back

Other
 Arlene Istar Lev (1986), family therapist and author of Transgender Emergence: Therapeutic Guidelines for Working with Gender-Variant People and their Families
 Suzanne Lyall, sophomore who disappeared after getting off a bus at Collins Circle in 1998
 Philip Markoff (2007), deceased, accused "Craigslist Killer"
 Peter Turkson, Cardinal of the Roman Catholic Church

Notable faculty
 Manuel Alvar (1977–98), head of the Spanish Royal Academy; known for his linguistic atlases of Spain and Spanish South America
 Branka Arsić, scholar of American literature, won the Modern Language Association's James Russell Lowell Prize in 2016
 Gonzalo Torrente Ballester (1966–70), Spanish Novelist (1910–1999); won Cervantes Prize in 1985
 Ronald A. Bosco (1975–present), Distinguished University Professor of English & American Literature (2004), SUNY Distinguished Service Professor (1992); president, Association for Documentary Editing; General Editor of The Collected Works of Ralph Waldo Emerson, Harvard; has edited, co-edited (primarily with Joel Myerson), and authored over 20 volumes on Emerson, Thoreau, Hawthorne, Michael Wigglesworth, and Cotton Mather
 Don Byrd (1971–present), poet and literary critic; works include his poetry collection Technics of Travel, the book-length poems The Great Dimestore Centennial and Aesop's Garden, an analysis of Charles Olson's Maximus, and his masterpiece of literary analysis The Poetics of Common Knowledge
 JoAnne Carson, painter and sculptor, Guggenheim Fellow (2016)
 Alan S. Chartock, political scientist and radio personality
 John Frederick Dewey (1971–1982), structural geologist widely regarded as an authority on the development and evolution of mountain ranges; Fellow of the Royal Society, Wollaston Medal and Penrose Medal recipient, member of the United States National Academy of Sciences
 Sandra K. Ellston, Shakespearean scholar, former Chair of Undergraduate Studies in English and co-director of the Humanities Center.
 Joachim Frank (1976–present), computational biologist, School of Public Health; investigator with the Howard Hughes Medical Institute at New York State's Wadsworth Center; elected in 2006 to National Academy of Sciences and named a fellow of the American Academy of Arts & Sciences
 Gordon G. Gallup (1975–present), evolutionary psychologist; developed the mirror test
 M. E. Grenander (1948–89), professor of English, authority on Ambrose Bierce, and benefactor of the M.E. Grenander Department of Special Collections and Archives
 George R. Goldner, art historian, former Drue Heinz Chairman of the Department of Drawings and Paints at the Metropolitan Museum of Art
 Pierre Joris (1992–present), poet, translator, anthologist; renowned translator of Paul Celan
 Leonard Kastle (1978–89), director of The Honeymoon Killers and notable opera composer of Deseret and The Pariahs
 William Kennedy (1974–present), 1984 winner of Pulitzer Prize for fiction for novel Ironweed; taught creative writing and journalism as UAlbany instructor from 1974 to 1982, thereafter full professor of creative writing; in 1983, awarded the John D. and Catherine T. MacArthur Foundation Fellowship, part of which went to UAlbany's New York State Writers Institute
 Scott Lilienfeld, author
 Michael J. Malbin (1990–present), political science, and expert on campaign finance; former speech writer to Richard B. Cheney
 Jon Mandle (1994–present), philosopher who works on issues of political theory and global justice; author of What's Left of Liberalism? An Interpretation and Defense of Justice as Fairness and Global Justice: An Introduction
 Ron McClamrock (1992–present), philosopher who works at the intersection of phenomenology and psychology; author of Existential Cognition: Minds in the World
 Toni Morrison (1985–89), author, Nobel and Pulitzer Prize-winning author (works include Beloved, The Bluest Eye, and Song of Solomon)
 Paul Pimsleur (1970–76), linguist, educator and researcher of the language acquisition process, and author of Pimsleur Language Series
 Vincent Schaefer, founder and longtime director of the Atmospheric Science Research Center (ASRC); discovered the first successful method of cloud seeding, with dry ice
 Richard E. Stearns, emeritus (1978–2000), Turing Award winner for computational complexity theory
 Bonnie Steinbock (1977–2014), philosopher, expert on reproductive ethics, and former chair of philosophy department
 Bernard Vonnegut (1967–85), atmospheric scientist known for expertise in the physics of lightning; as a colleague of Vincent Schaefer at General Electric in 1946, discovered silver iodide method of cloud-seeding; older brother of author Kurt Vonnegut
 David Wills (1998–2013), translator of Jacques Derrida

University presidents

References

University at Albany

University at Albany, SUNY alumni
University at Albany, SUNY faculty